Karaitivu (Kãra Divaina) is an island off the coast of Jaffna peninsula in northern Sri Lanka, located approximately  north-west of the city of Jaffna.

Etymology
Present Karaitivu has been identified with ancient Kãra Divaina (the Island of Kãra). This island is referred to in the 12th-century Rameswaram Sinhala inscription of King Nissankamalla (1187-1196 A.D.) as "Kãra Divaina". The Nampota, an ancient Sinhala text written after the 14th century also mentions this island as Kãra Divaina.

Karaitivu means "the island of karai shrubs" in Tamil and is derived from the Tamil words karai (Webera tetrandra, a thorny shrub from the family Rubiaceae) and tivu (island). The island was known as Amsterdam during Dutch colonial rule.

The island

Karaitivu is connected to Jaffna peninsula by a causeway and there is a ferry service from Kayts on the neighbouring island of Velanaitivu. Karainagar is the main settlement on the island. The popular Casuarina Beach is located on the island.

References

External links

Islands of Jaffna District
Karainagar DS Division